Swastik Productions Pvt. Ltd. is an Indian production company which produces television series and entertainment content. It was founded by Siddharth Kumar Tewary who serves as the company's creative director.

Swastik produced series like Agle Janam Mohe Bitiya Hi Kijo, Mahabharat, and "RadhaKrishn".

Present shows

Upcoming broadcasts

Past shows

References

External links
 Swastik Productions

Swastik Productions
Companies based in Mumbai
Television production companies of India
Entertainment companies of India
2007 establishments in Maharashtra
Entertainment companies established in 2007